Potomac Shores station is a future Virginia Railway Express station located in Dumfries, Virginia. The station will serve the Fredericksburg Line and is expected to open in 2023. As of April 2021, a construction contract was expected to be awarded late 2021, and construction is expected to take roughly eighteen months.

History 
The station is being built as part of a residential community. It shares the right-of-way on the CSX RF&P Subdivision with Amtrak's Northeast Regional,  Silver Meteor, Silver Star,  Palmetto, Auto Train, and Carolinian trains; however, no Amtrak trains are planned to stop here. The station was first announced in 2013 with the approval of the Potomac Shores residential community, and originally planned to open in 2017. The design of the station has changed over the decade to accommodate planned expansions of the rail line (such as the new passenger bridge parallel to the existing Long Bridge) and VRE service.

References

Transportation in Prince William County, Virginia
Virginia Railway Express stations
Rail infrastructure in Virginia
Rail infrastructure in Washington, D.C.
Railway stations scheduled to open in 2023